Hatunköy can refer to:

 Hatunköy, Çat
 Hatunköy, Maden